The following radio stations broadcast on FM frequency 98.5 MHz:

Argentina
 985 radio in Punta Alta, Buenos Aires
 Cielo in San Bernardo, Buenos Aires
 Meridiano in Coronel Charlone, Córdoba
 Momentos in Grutly, Santa Fe
 Orfeo in Córdoba
 Plus in Corrientes
 Popular in San Luis
 RD1 in Zárate, Buenos Aires

Australia
 2OOO in Sydney, New South Wales
 4YOU in Rockhampton, Queensland
 ABC Classic FM in Bundaberg, Queensland
 Huon FM in Huon Valley, Tasmania
 98.5 Apple (FM) in Melbourne, Victoria
 3ONE in Shepparton, Victoria
 Radio National in Portland, Victoria
 Sonshine FM in Perth, Western Australia

Canada (Channel 253)
 CHMP-FM in Montreal, Quebec
 CBCW-FM in Whitney, Ontario
 CBH-FM-3 in Yarmouth, Nova Scotia
 CBKM-FM in Meadow Lake, Saskatchewan
 CBOF-FM-4 in Rolphton, Ontario 
 CFCD-FM in Dryden, Ontario
 CFCE-FM in Guyer, Quebec
 CFTH-FM-2 in Baie-des-Moutons, Quebec
 CFWE-FM-4 in Spruce Grove, Alberta
 CHMP-FM in Longueuil, Quebec
 CHOR-FM in Summerland, British Columbia
 CHRX-FM in Fort St. John, British Columbia
 CIAM-FM-11 in Venderhoof, British Columbia
 CIBK-FM in Calgary, Alberta
 CIOA-FM in Orillia, Ontario
 CIOC-FM in Victoria, British Columbia
 CIOC-FM-1 in Saltspring Island, British Columbia
 CIOS-FM in Stephenville, Newfoundland and Labrador
 CJRG-FM-5 in Grande Vallee, Quebec
 CJWL-FM in Ottawa, Ontario
 CKRH-FM in Halifax, Nova Scotia
 CKWR-FM in Kitchener/Waterloo, Ontario
 VF2403 in Kilometre 38, Quebec
 VF2593 in Notre-Dame-du-Mont-Carmel, Quebec

Germany
 AFN Europe in Grafenwoehr, Bavaria
 Bayern 3 in Munich, Bavaria

Guatemala (Channel 27)
TGVB-FM in Guatemala City

Marshall Islands
BBC World Service at Majuro

Malaysia
 TraXX FM in Central Kelantan

Mexico
 XHBH-FM in Hermosillo, Sonora
 XHCLI-FM in Culiacán, Sinaloa
 XHCQ-FM in Tuxtla Gutiérrez, Chiapas
 XHDL-FM in Mexico City
 XHEB-FM in Ciudad Obregón, Sonora
 XHEOM-FM in Coatzacoalcos, Veracruz
 XHEPIC-FM in Tepic, Nayarit
 XHETO-FM in Tampico, Tamaulipas
 XHJS-FM in Hidalgo del Parral, Chihuahua
 XHMAR-FM in Acapulco, Guerrero
 XHMT-FM in Mérida, Yucatán
 XHNR-FM in Oaxaca, Oaxaca
 XHPCTQ-FM in Chetumal, Quintana Roo
 XHPVTS-FM in Villa Tututepec-Santiago Jocotepec, Oaxaca
 XHQK-FM in San Luis Potosí, San Luis Potosí
 XHSAP-FM in Agua Prieta, Sonora
 XHTYL-FM in Monterrey, Nuevo León
 XHWA-FM in Xalapa, Veracruz
 XHYQ-FM in Fresnillo, Zacatecas
 XHZHO-FM in Zihuatanejo, Guerrero
 XHZI-FM in Zacapu, Michoacán

United Kingdom
 CNR1 in London

United States (Channel 253)
 KAAI in Palisade, Colorado
  in Los Alamos, New Mexico
 KACO in Apache, Oklahoma
 KBBT in Schertz, Texas
  in Kalispell, Montana
 KDES-FM in Cathedral City, California
 KDFO in Delano, California
 KDNN in Honolulu, Hawaii
  in Billings, Montana
  in McAllen, Texas
 KGIL in Johannesburg, California
  in Maxwell, Nebraska
 KHDY-FM in Clarksville, Texas
 KHGC in Montana City, Montana
 KHIC in Keno, Oregon
 KIFX in Naples, Utah
 KKFL-LP in Fowler, Colorado
 KKHQ-FM in Cedar Falls, Iowa
 KLGW in Grand Coulee, Washington
 KLKX-LP in Alexandria, Minnesota
 KLLP in Blackfoot, Idaho
  in Las Vegas, Nevada
 KNBQ in Central Park, Washington
 KOLS-LP in Oakhurst, California
 KOYC-LP in Pueblo, Colorado
 KPSA-FM in Lordsburg, New Mexico
  in Council Bluffs, Iowa
 KQOV-LP in Butte, Montana
 KRFM in Show Low, Arizona
 KRGL in Ringgold, Louisiana
 KRGN-LP in Kileen, Texas
  in Sacramento, California
 KRXT in Rockdale, Texas
 KRYZ-LP in Mariposa, California
 KSAJ-FM in Burlingame, Kansas
  in Minneapolis, Minnesota
  in Farmington, Missouri
 KTJM in Port Arthur, Texas
  in San Jose, California
  in Little Rock, Arkansas
  in Tulsa, Oklahoma
 KVTT in Palisade, Colorado
 KWBY-FM in Ranger, Texas
 KWEB-LP in Webb City, Missouri
  in Windsor, Missouri
 KWYG-LP in Cheyenne, Wyoming
 KXGC-LP in Flagstaff, Arizona
 KXGV-LP in Garden Valley, Idaho
 KXWI in Williston, North Dakota
  in Denver, Colorado
  in Orofino, Idaho
 WACL in Elkton, Virginia
 WBBO in Ocean Acres, New Jersey
  in Westhampton, New York
  in Boston, Massachusetts
  in Hartsville, South Carolina
  in Lake George, New York
  in Marietta, Ohio
  in Catskill, New York
 WDAI in Pawleys Island, South Carolina
  in Rocky Mount, North Carolina
 WEBB in Waterville, Maine
 WFFY in San Carlos Park, Florida
  in Panama City, Florida
  in Oil City, Pennsylvania
 WHPB-LP in Orlando, Florida
 WHUM-LP in Columbus, Indiana
 WINF-LP in Delaware, Ohio
  in Linden, Alabama
 WJHI-LP in Jeffersonville, Indiana
 WJTE-LP in East Berstadt, Kentucky
 WJYN-LP in North Philadelphia, Pennsylvania
 WKEM-LP in Montgomery, Alabama
  in Freeland, Pennsylvania
  in Niagara Falls, New York
 WKSW in Cookeville, Tennessee
  in Crystal River, Florida
  in Ocilla, Georgia
 WLSB in Augusta, Illinois
 WMYK in Peru, Indiana
 WNCX in Cleveland, Ohio
 WNUW-LP in Aston, Pennsylvania
 WNWN in Coldwater, Michigan
  in Waterloo, New York
  in Lexington, South Carolina
  in Eureka, Illinois
 WQAZ-LP in Edmond, West Virginia
 WQEW-LP in Philadelphia, Pennsylvania
  in Ferdinand, Indiana
 WQLH in Green Bay, Wisconsin
 WRPE-LP in Jacksonville, Florida
  in Cincinnati, Ohio
 WSAX-LP in Columbus, Ohio
  in Atlanta, Georgia
  in Satellite Beach, Florida
 WSHI-LP in Shelbyville, Indiana
 WTFM in Kingsport, Tennessee
 WUPS in Houghton Lake, Michigan
 WUSX in Seaford, Delaware
 WVHV-LP in Harrisville, West Virginia
 WWVR in Paris, Illinois
 WXPM-LP in Phoenixville, Pennsylvania
  in Freeport, Illinois
  in York-Hanover, Pennsylvania
  in New Orleans, Louisiana
 WYRA in Confluence, Pennsylvania
 WYTX-LP in Rock Hill, South Carolina
 WZDK-LP in Decatur, Alabama
  in Tupelo, Mississippi

Venezuela 
 RadioTrafico, 24-hour Spanish radio station delivering traffic information for Valencia.

Vietnam 
 Da Nang radio and VOH 99.9 in Da Nang city

References

Lists of radio stations by frequency